John Lumley-Savile may refer to:

John Lumley-Savile, 7th Earl of Scarbrough (1761 – 1835), British peer
John Lumley-Savile, 8th Earl of Scarbrough (1788 – 1856), British peer and politician
John Savile Lumley-Savile, 2nd Baron Savile (1854–1931), British peer and diplomat

See also
John Lumley (disambiguation)
John Savile (disambiguation)